Scopula alboverticata is a moth of the  family Geometridae. It is found on Timor.

References

Moths described in 1895
alboverticata
Moths of Asia